Gabrielle Westbrook-Patrick (born 28 January 1996), is a New Zealand-born Australian model of Samoan, Irish, German, and English descent.

Early life
Westbrook was born in Auckland, New Zealand as an only child. Her family moved to Australia when she was two.

Westbrook started out as a child model but did not officially sign with a major agency until 2012. She grew up in the Paddington area of Sydney before moving to New York to pursue an international modeling career.

Career 
At the age of 15 Westbrook was discovered by Kathy Ward, owner of Chic Model Management at The Girlfriend Model Search, the same competition that launched Miranda Kerr's career.

In 2013 she was selected to be the face of the L’Oréal Melbourne Fashion Festival. She has been on the cover of magazines such as Harper's Bazaar, Elle Australia shot by Derek Henderson, and Marie Claire. Her modeling portfolio includes features in magazines such as Vogue and RUSSH. Westbrook's career has also included advertising campaigns for brands such as Urban Outfitters, Armani, Vera Wang, Diesel and Elie Saab.

References

External links
 

1996 births
Living people
Australian female models
Australian expatriates in the United States
Australian people of Samoan descent
Australian people of German descent
Australian people of English descent
Australian people of Irish descent
New Zealand emigrants to Australia
People from New South Wales